Frosti may refer to:

 Frost, a mythical Finnish leader - see Fornjót
 Frosti Jonsson (born 1972), Icelandic musician known as Bistro Boy
 Frosti Sigurjónsson (born 1962), Icelandic politician
 "Frosti", a track on the 2001  Björk album Vespertine

See also
 Frosty (disambiguation)

Icelandic masculine given names